Parkhouse Halt railway station was built for the nearby RAF Kingstown (later RAF Carlisle) from 1941 to 1969 on the Waverley Line.

History 
The station opened on 7 July 1941 by the LNER to serve the workers at the nearby RAF Kingstown depot. The halt was not available to members of the public. Due to this, it was not believed to have nameboards installed. The halt closed on 6 January 1969 along with the line.

References 

Disused railway stations in Cumbria
Railway stations in Great Britain opened in 1941
Railway stations in Great Britain closed in 1969
Former London and North Eastern Railway stations
Beeching closures in England